Eddie Morten (born 29 May 1962), also spelled 'Eddy', is a Canadian Paralympic athlete who won bronze in the 5 km Walk in 1980, gold in the -65 kg category in Wrestling in 1984, and bronze in Judo in the -71 kg category in Judo in 1988. Morten has been the Coordinator of the Deafblind Services Society of British Columbia's Volunteer Intervention Program since 2007, and in 2009 was awarded the Western Institute for the Deaf and Hard of Hearing's Award of Merit for his advocacy on behalf of the deaf-blind community. He is the younger brother of Pier Morten, another successful Canadian Paralympian. Morten was born deaf but with good vision, which has gradually deteriorated due to Usher Syndrome. He is now completely blind in his left eye and has severely limited vision in his right eye.

Human Rights Tribunal
In August 2004, Morten asked his travel agent to book him a flight from Vancouver, British Columbia to San Francisco, California, but was told that the airline, Air Canada, would not allow him to fly without an attendant because he is deaf and partially blind. Morten filed a complaint with the Canadian Human Rights Commission in September 2005, alleging that Air Canada had discriminated against him because of his disability. In January 2009, the Tribunal ruled that Air Canada had discriminated against Morten and ordered the airline to pay him $10,000 plus interest for pain and suffering.   The full Tribunal Decision document is available in the 'External links' section below.

See also
Judo in British Columbia
Judo in Canada
List of Canadian judoka
Wrestling in Canada

References

External links
Decision - Eddy Morten (Canadian Human Rights Tribunal)

Video
Interview with Morten as Coordinator of the Deafblind Services of British Columbia's Volunteer Intervention Program (Garret Wasny on YouTube)

1962 births
Living people
Medalists at the 1980 Summer Paralympics
Medalists at the 1984 Summer Paralympics
Medalists at the 1988 Summer Paralympics
Paralympic gold medalists for Canada
Paralympic bronze medalists for Canada
Paralympic track and field athletes of Canada
Paralympic wrestlers of Canada
Paralympic judoka of Canada
Athletes (track and field) at the 1980 Summer Paralympics
Wrestlers at the 1984 Summer Paralympics
Judoka at the 1988 Summer Paralympics
Paralympic medalists in athletics (track and field)
Paralympic medalists in judo
Canadian deafblind people
Canadian male judoka
Canadian male racewalkers
Visually impaired track and field athletes